P.J. Hoffmaster State Park is a public recreation area on the shores of Lake Michigan located five miles north of Grand Haven at the southwest corner of Norton Shores, in Muskegon County, and the northwest corner of Spring Lake Township, in Ottawa County, in the U.S. state of Michigan. It is operated by the Michigan Department of Natural Resources. The state park includes  of land including  of sand beach on the lake.

History
Established in 1963, the park is named after Percy James Hoffmaster, sometimes considered the founder of the Michigan state parks system, who served as the Superintendent of State Parks and longest-acting Director of the Department of Conservation. The park's nature center is named for Emma Genevieve Gillette, who scouted locations for new state parks under Hoffmaster.

Activities and amenities
The Gillette Sand Dune Visitor Center features interactive exhibits related to the sand dune ecosystem within the park. The center also has live animals and an auditorium and offers many nature programs for the public. There are two campgrounds and a beach. Bird watchers come to view migrating songbirds (wood thrushes and orioles plus warblers and sparrows of various species) and migrating raptors (sharp-shinned and broad-winged hawks and even the occasional eagle or falcon).

In the news
The park made international headlines on July 8, 2009, when a man fell asleep in his truck and backed over his family tent, injuring his wife and two young children.

References

External links
Hoffmaster State Park Michigan Department of Natural Resources
Hoffmaster State Park Map Michigan Department of Natural Resources
Gillette Nature Association at Hoffmaster State Park Gillette Nature Association

State parks of Michigan
Beaches of Michigan
Natural history museums in Michigan
Museums in Muskegon County, Michigan
Museums in Ottawa County, Michigan
Protected areas of Muskegon County, Michigan
Protected areas of Ottawa County, Michigan
Nature centers in Michigan
Landforms of Ottawa County, Michigan
Landforms of Muskegon County, Michigan
Protected areas established in 1963
1963 establishments in Michigan
IUCN Category III